Yeimer López García (born August 28, 1982, in Buey Arriba, Granma) is a middle distance runner from Cuba, who represented his native country at two consecutive Summer Olympics, starting in 2004.

He is best known for winning the gold medal in the men's 800 metres at the 2007 Pan American Games in Brazil. López is the twin brother (fraternal) of female sprinter Ana López.

Personal bests
400 m: 45.11 s – Saint-Denis, 24 August 2003
400 m (indoor): 47.98 s – Sabadell, 22 January 2011
800 m: 1:43.07 min –  Jerez de la Frontera, 24 June 2008

International competitions

References

External links
 
 
 Tilastopaja biography

1982 births
Living people
Cuban male middle-distance runners
Olympic athletes of Cuba
Athletes (track and field) at the 2008 Summer Olympics
Pan American Games gold medalists for Cuba
Pan American Games medalists in athletics (track and field)
Athletes (track and field) at the 2003 Pan American Games
Athletes (track and field) at the 2007 Pan American Games
World Athletics Championships athletes for Cuba
Pan American Games silver medalists for Cuba
Central American and Caribbean Games gold medalists for Cuba
Competitors at the 2006 Central American and Caribbean Games
Central American and Caribbean Games medalists in athletics
Medalists at the 2003 Pan American Games
Medalists at the 2007 Pan American Games
People from Granma Province